The Screen Award for Best Film is chosen by a distinguished panel of judges from the Indian "Bollywood" film industry and the winners are announced in January. Frequent winners include Ashutosh Gowariker (3 times) and Yash Chopra, Sanjay Leela Bhansali and Rakesh Roshan who have won 2 times each.

Winners

See also

 Bollywood
 Cinema of India
 Screen Awards

Notes

Film
Awards for best film